Aaron Fowler (b. July 23, 1988, St. Louis, Missouri) is an American contemporary interdisciplinary artist who lives and works in Los Angeles. His work has been shown at the New Museum, Studio Museum in Harlem, Rubell Museum, Seattle Art Museum, Columbus College of Art and Design, and Hammer Museum. Much of his work deals with community involvement through his project Into Existence. 

Fowler received his BFA from the Pennsylvania Academy of the Fine Arts and his MFA from Yale University School of Art. He also attended the Skowhegan School of Painting and Sculpture in 2014.

References 

1988 births
Living people
Interdisciplinary artists
Artists from St. Louis
Artists from Los Angeles
21st-century American artists
Pennsylvania Academy of the Fine Arts alumni
Yale School of Art alumni
Skowhegan School of Painting and Sculpture alumni